is an avant-garde composer, singer, synthesizer player, and member of the rock band Factor.

Career 
Sato moved to London, England in 1995.

He has performed in the United Kingdom, Germany and Denmark. In London, he has performed at the Rock Garden, the Red Eye (on a bill with Ridiculous and the Kenny Process Team), the Bull and Gate, and Spitz.  He toured Germany with the Frank Chickens, appearing at the clubs Tanzdiele and B-Movie.

After returning to Japan, he has performed in Asagaya, Suginami, Tokyo.

Compositions 
His composition works are Discommunication City, Surreal Man, and Factor

External links 
 Website of band Factor

1967 births
Avant-garde composers
Japanese composers
Japanese male composers
Japanese male musicians
Japanese male singers
Living people
Singers from Tokyo